The Volga is a river of Russia.

Volga may also refer to:

Places
Russia
Volga Delta,  the delta of the Volga River
Volga economic region
Volga Federal District 
Volga Region, an historical region
Volga, Russia, several rural localities in Russia

United States
Volga, Indiana, an unincorporated town
Volga, Iowa, a city
Volga Township, Clayton County, Iowa
Volga, Kentucky, an unincorporated community
Volga, South Dakota, a city
Volga, Texas, an unincorporated community
Volga, West Virginia, an unincorporated community
Volga River (Iowa), a river

Other
1149 Volga, an asteroid

In business
Volga (automobile), a Russian brand
Volga (finance), in quantitative finance, a second order derivative of an option pricing formula versus volatility
Air Volga, a former airline headquartered in Moscow
VoLGA Forum, an organisation of telecommunication vendors and operators

In sports and games
FC Volga Ulyanovsk
Volga Ulyanovsk Bandy Club
Volga Gambit, original name of the Benko Gambit in chess

In other uses
Volga class motorship, a type of Russian river passenger ship
Volga radar, a Russian early warning radar in Belarus
Operation Volga or 2 June 2006 Forest Gate raid on alleged terrorists by Metropolitan Police in London, England
Volga Highway, see M7 highway (Russia)
Volga (rocket stage), a rocket upper stage designed in Russia
Volga, pen name of P. Lalita Kumari, Telugu female writer
Volga, a character in Hyrule Warriors

See also
Volga Volga (1928 film), a German silent film
Volga-Volga, a 1938 Soviet film
Volga Germans, ethnic Germans living in the Volga Region in Russia
Volzhsk
Volzhsky (disambiguation)
Volha